Guzman y Gomez (Holdings) Ltd (GYG) is an Australian multinational casual-dining and fast food restaurant chain. It specialises in Mexican cuisine with dishes such as burritos, nachos, tacos, quesadillas and other Mexican-inspired items, including drinks.

Guzman y Gomez was established in Sydney in 2006 by New York City duo Steven Marks and Robert Hazan, and locally operates over 150 restaurants. It has expanded internationally with locales in Japan, Singapore and the United States.

Restaurants

In Australia, the franchise had 135 restaurants in operation as of 2016. The franchise operates internationally in Singapore, Japan, and the United States. The company continues to expand with new stores around Australia. In 12 years, they have opened 100 stores in Australia. They opened 23 new restaurants since early 2020 and more than 30 new restaurants are planned by mid 2022.

History

Guzman y Gomez was established by Steven Marks, a New Yorker who previously worked as a hedge fund manager. After relocating to Australia, he found the quality of Mexican food to be poor and decided to start a restaurant. He has stated that "real Mexican is really urban, street and hot [...] Latin people are so full of energy and full of life, we wanted to bring that to Australia". He took on his friend Robert Hazan, another New Yorker, as a partner. They named the business after two of Marks' childhood friends.

The first store was opened in Newtown, Sydney in 2006. Store openings in Bondi Junction and Kings Cross followed within a year. By April 2012, there were 12 stores. The first Guzman y Gomez in the Melbourne CBD opened in November 2012.

International expansion

The first international Guzman y Gomez restaurant opened at the end of 2013 in Singapore, followed thereafter by the opening of a restaurant in Tokyo, Japan in April 2015. In January 2020, Guzman y Gomez's international expansion continued with the opening of their first restaurant in the United States in the Chicago suburb of Naperville, Illinois.

Ownership and finance

Marks and Hazan initially supported GYG with their own money. In 2009 they sold a minority stake to Peter Ritchie, Guy Russo and Steve Jermyn, who had previously been involved with McDonald's Australia. Russo was subsequently appointed chairman of the board. The board also includes co-founder Robert Hazan, 3 former McDonalds executives, Tom Cowan of TDM Growth Partners, and Rokt CEO Bruce Buchanan. Investment firm TDM Growth Partners bought a stake in the company for $44 million in August 2018. In December 2020, the publicly listed Magellan Financial Group bought 10% of the company for $86.8 million. In May 2022, Magellan sold its 11.6% stake in the company to an entity owned by investment bank Barrenjoey Capital Partners for $140 million.

Marks stated in 2019 that his goal was to list GYG on the Australian Stock Exchange (ASX). In 2020 he stated that he was also ambitious to expand the company's presence in the United States, citing Australia's "antiquated" labour laws, high rents, and expensive fresh produce.

See also

List of restaurants in Australia
List of Mexican restaurants

References

External links
 (in Australia)

Fast-food chains of Australia
Fast-food Mexican restaurants
Food and drink companies based in Sydney
Theme restaurants
Restaurants established in 2006
2006 establishments in Australia
Mexican restaurants in Australia